WRMJ (102.3 FM) is a commercial radio station that serves the Aledo, Illinois area, as well as Mercer and surrounding counties in the northwest central and west central portions of Illinois, and southeast central and east central portions of Iowa.  The station broadcasts a Country format.  WRMJ is owned by Western Illinois Broadcasting and has its transmitter located on 151st Street in rural Mercer County, just off Illinois Route 17 west of Aledo.

A small town based and locally owned radio station, WRMJ broadcasts a variety of news content, including national news from the ABC Direction Network, agriculture news from the Brownfield Radio Network, and local news, including weather, sports, and local area farm news.  WRMJ also provides coverage of area high school sports in Mercer and surrounding counties, and carries St. Louis Cardinals Baseball during the Baseball Season and University of Illinois Football and Basketball during the college football and basketball seasons respectively.  Local religious services are broadcast at various times on Sundays.

Sources

External links
 WRMJ Official Website
 
 WRMJ Coverage Map

RMJ
Mercer County, Illinois
1979 establishments in Illinois